The Post and Courier is the main daily newspaper in Charleston, South Carolina.  It traces its ancestry to three newspapers, the Charleston Courier, founded in 1803, the Charleston Daily News, founded 1865, and The Evening Post, founded 1894.  Through the Courier, it brands itself as the oldest daily newspaper in the South and one of the oldest continuously operating newspapers in the United States.  It is the flagship newspaper of Evening Post Industries, which in turn is owned by the Manigault family of Charleston, descendants of Peter Manigault.

It is the largest newspaper in South Carolina, followed by Columbia's The State and The Greenville News.

History 

The Charleston Courier, founded in 1803. The founder of the Courier, Aaron Smith Willington, came from Massachusetts with newspaper experience. In the early 19th century, he was known to row out to meet ships from London, Liverpool, Havre, and New York City to get the news earlier than other Charleston papers. He also had a translator working for him, so he could copy items from the Havana newspapers. Rudolph Septimus Siegling also served as editor during the 1800s. TheCharleston Daily News, founded in 1865, merged with it to form the News and Courier in 1873.  

The Evening Post was founded in 1894, but quickly ran into financial trouble. In 1896, rice planter Arthur Manigault stepped in to rescue the paper. The paper and its successors have been in the hands of the Manigault family for four generations. In 1926, Manigault's son, Robert, bought The News and Courier.

During the Civil Rights Era, the News and Courier was virulently segregationist; indeed, Time described it as the most segregationist newspaper in the South. Its editor, Thomas R. Waring Jr., was a staunch segregationist, as was staffer W. D. Workman Jr., who ran for public office in a campaign that united South Carolina's formerly divided racial and economic conservatives.

Merger
By 1991, it was apparent Charleston could no longer support two newspapers, so the News and Courier and Evening Post were merged into a single morning newspaper, The Post and Courier.  However, the two papers had shared the same editorial staff since the 1980s.

The paper acquired several sisters in the 1990s when its parent bought other newspapers and television stations.

In July 2021, the Post and Courier announced a relocation of its offices to 148 Williman Street.

Awards 

The newspaper has won the highest awards in journalism, frequently besting much larger news organizations. It has taken a leadership role in exposing corruption and reducing local news deserts with its Uncovered project, a partnership with more than 18 South Carolina newspapers. The project won the 2021 S.C. Press Association's top award for Public Service. In 2015 it won the Pulitzer Prize for Public Service for coverage of domestic violence. In 2019, Tony Bartelme won the inaugural Victor K. McElheny Knight Science Journalism Award for a story about climate change and the Gulf Stream. In 2016, a team of reporters won a Scripps Howard Foundation Award for an investigation into police shootings. In 2018, the newspaper won the American Society of News Editors Deborah Howell Award for a story about the demise of the Piggly Wiggly Carolina grocery chain. In 2017, the American Geophysical Union awarded Tony Bartelme its Walter Sullivan Award for Excellence in Science Journalism for "Every Other Breath," a series about climate change issues. In 2008, the newspaper won national awards from the Society of Professional Journalists and American Society of Newspaper Editors for coverage of the Charleston Sofa Super Store fire. In 2008, Reporter Tony Bartelme also won the prestigious Gerald Loeb Award for a story about the effect of China's growth on local economies.

Circulation figures 

The reported numbers for The Post and Courier's circulation as of the six months ended September 30, 2009, were 86,084 daily and 94,940 on Sundays. This is down some 13% from the period ended March 31, 2008, which were 99,459 daily and 110,289 on Sunday.

At the start of 2009, The Post and Courier's circulation figures were down to 94,647 for dailies and 97,549 for Sundays, 4.8% down from the previous year's figures. By the end of 2012, the circulation figures (including paid and non-paid) had declined to 82,266 for dailies and 92,062 for Sundays. 

For the 4th quarter of 2015, paid circulation had dropped to 68,400 for Sundays and 56,000-57,000 for dailies as reported by the Alliance for Audited Media. In the first quarter of 2020, audited daily and Sunday circulation totals were at 45,016 and 51,190, respectively.

Layoffs 

A decline in revenue made the paper offer a buyout to employees in 2008 in an attempt to streamline the company and save money. After 64 full-time employees left, bringing the headcount down to 381 by the start of 2009.

On February 6, 2009, 25 more layoffs were announced.

On March 23, 2009, Evening Post Publishing Co., the parent company of the paper, announced that a company-wide furlough plan would take place in the second quarter of 2009 and required employees to take five days of unpaid leave in another attempt to save the company money. The newspaper said the move was necessary "because of the continued weakness of the economy and the impact on advertising."

Charleston Scene

One addition to the paper is the weekly Charleston Scene guide—published on a Thursday, containing entertainment, music and food reviews for the local area.

On February 1, 2010, it was announced that Preview was renamed and re-launched as Charleston Scene, as of 11 March 2010.

See also
 Anthony Hart Harrigan, former editor 
 List of newspapers in South Carolina

Notes

External links
 Official Website (mobile)
 Evening Post Industries
 News and Courier records archived with the South Carolina Historical Society

Newspapers published in South Carolina
Publications established in 1803
Pulitzer Prize for Public Service winners
Pulitzer Prize-winning newspapers
1803 establishments in the United States
 
Mass media in Charleston, South Carolina